The Tampa Bay Titans are an American professional basketball team in The Basketball League and are based in Tampa, Florida.

History
On February 25, 2018, Dave Magley stated that Tampa, Florida, was approved as a basketball franchise for the upcoming 2019 season. On July 8, 2018, the team was announced as the Tampa Bay Titans. Bassel Harfouch, the team's owner, became the first ever player-owner in a professional league. He played professionally in Lebanon.

Current roster

References

External links
Tampa Bay Titans website

Basketball teams in Florida
The Basketball League teams
2018 establishments in Florida
Basketball teams established in 2018
Sports teams in Tampa, Florida
New Port Richey, Florida